Spilarctia enarotali is a moth in the family Erebidae. It was described by Rob de Vos and Daawia Suhartawan in 2011. It is found in Papua, Indonesia, where it seems to be restricted to the Paniai area.

References

Moths described in 2011
enarotali